(Pyruvate, phosphate dikinase)-phosphate phosphotransferase (PPDK regulatory protein, pyruvate, phosphate dikinase regulatory protein, bifunctional dikinase regulatory protein, PDRP1 (gene)) is an enzyme with systematic name (pyruvate, phosphate dikinase) phosphate:phosphate phosphotransferase. This enzyme catalyses the following chemical reaction

 [pyruvate, phosphate dikinase] phosphate + phosphate  [pyruvate, phosphate dikinase] + diphosphate

The enzyme from the plants maize and arabidopsis is bifunctional and also catalyses the phosphorylation of pyruvate (EC 2.7.11.32).

References

External links 
 

EC 2.7.4